Ilke Wyludda (born 28 March 1969) is a discus thrower from Germany.

She set eleven junior records at discus throw (and also two at shot put), and became junior world champion. Between 1989 and 1991 she recorded 41 successive wins until beaten by Tsvetanka Khristova at the 1991 World Championships. Wyludda never won the world championships, but she became Olympic champion in 1996.

In early January 2011 Wyludda revealed in Bild that she had to have her right leg amputated because of Sepsis. After losing her leg she returned to athletics and began entering para-sport competitions. In 2012, she represented Germany at the London Paralympics becoming the first German athlete to have represented her country at both Olympic and Paralympic Games. In 2014, she entered the IPC European Championships in Swansea, taking the bronze medal in the F57 discus and silver in the shot put.

Personal bests
Discus throw - 74.56 (1989)
Discus throw U23 - 74.56 (1989) WU23B
Discus throw Junior - 74,40 (1988) WJB
Discus throw Youth - 65,86 (1986) WYB
Shot put - 20.23 (1988)
Shot put U23 - 20,23 (1988)
Shot put Junior - 20,23 (1988)
Shot put Youth - 19,08 (1986) WYB

International competitions

References

External links

 
 
 Wyniki Wyludda na stronie rzutyiskoki 

1969 births
Living people
Athletes from Leipzig
East German female discus throwers
East German female shot putters
German female discus throwers
German female shot putters
German amputees
Discus throwers with limb difference
Olympic gold medalists for Germany
Olympic athletes of Germany
Athletes (track and field) at the 1992 Summer Olympics
Athletes (track and field) at the 1996 Summer Olympics
Medalists at the 1996 Summer Olympics
Athletes (track and field) at the 2000 Summer Olympics
World Athletics Championships athletes for East Germany
World Athletics Championships athletes for Germany
World Athletics Championships medalists
European Athletics Championships medalists
Paralympic athletes of Germany
Athletes (track and field) at the 2012 Summer Paralympics
Olympic gold medalists in athletics (track and field)
Goodwill Games medalists in athletics
Competitors at the 1998 Goodwill Games
Competitors at the 1990 Goodwill Games
World Athletics U20 Championships winners